Joseph Michael Fletcher (born 25 September 1946) is an English former professional footballer who played as a forward for Rochdale, Grimsby Town and Barrow. In the 1967–68 season, he was top goalscorer for Rochdale.

References

1946 births
Living people
Footballers from Manchester
English footballers
Association football forwards
Manchester City F.C. players
Rochdale A.F.C. players
Grimsby Town F.C. players
Barrow A.F.C. players
Chorley F.C. players
Wigan Athletic F.C. players
Mossley A.F.C. players
Macclesfield Town F.C. players
English Football League players